The Republic of Paraguay is a country in South America.

Paraguay may also refer to:

Paraguay, Cuba
Paraguay River, a major river in south central South America

See also